Murder on the Zinderneuf is a 1983 video game designed by Jon Freeman and Paul Reiche III and one of the first six games published by Electronic Arts (Ariolasoft in Europe). It was developed for the Apple II, Commodore 64, Atari 8-bit family, and the IBM PC (as a self-booting disk).

The Apple II version was programmed by Alan Pavlish of Designer Software. All other versions were programmed by Robert Leyland. The Commodore 64 version states it was by Mission Accomplished, but also gives credit to Leyland for programming.

Plot
The game is set in 1936. The player is a detective traveling across the Atlantic aboard the world's most luxurious dirigible, the Zinderneuf. The craft is full of high-profile personalities from all walks of life. A murder takes place aboard the Zinderneuf, and it is up to the player to identify the culprit before the ship lands.

Gameplay

The player is given a choice of eight detectives to play; former policeman turned private detective Harry Hacksaw (based on Dirty Harry), French police inspector Emile Klutzeau (based on Inspector Clouseau), amateur sleuth Agatha Marbles (based on Miss Marple), German-British detective Humbolt Hause (based on Sherlock Holmes), NYPD Lieutenant Cincinnato (based on Columbo), mysterious adventurer Charity Flaire (based on Modesty Blaise), Swiss detective Achille Merlot (based on Hercule Poirot), and gentleman thief Jethro Knight (based on Simon Templar). Each has a distinct personality as well as strengths and weaknesses. They must then search the rooms of the dirigible for possible clues, as well as interview passengers to identify the killer. The detective must carefully choose his or her method of questioning suspects. Choosing the right approach means that a character is more likely to offer useful clues.

Once they are satisfied that they have a culprit, the detective has the option of accusing them directly, or waiting until enough clues are found to prove their hunch. If they are wrong, the person they have accused will not speak to them for the remainder of the game. A denial does not always mean the detective is wrong, only that more proof is required for the murderer to confess.

If the detective is correct, the killer will explain the motives behind their crime, and the detective is given one of six ratings based on the effectiveness of their investigation.

The player is presented with a different murderer and victim each time the game is played. This, combined with the depth of narrative detail in the stories and characters, makes the game highly replayable. Each real-time game finishes in 36 minutes to encourage many replays.

Development
Murder on the Zinderneuf is an adventure game, but by randomly generating stories it is replayable. Designer Jon Freeman stated in the December 1980 BYTE that "a game like Adventure is really a puzzle that, once solved, is without further interest"; by contrast, he wrote, computer role-playing games like his Dunjonquest series offer unpredictable play and replay opportunities. Freeman said that the game was a homage to the classic board game, Cluedo, but there are obvious influences from books and movies in the mystery genre, ranging from Agatha Christie's Miss Marple and Hercule Poirot books, to Sherlock Holmes and the films of Humphrey Bogart. A number of famous personalities from the 1930s may also have inspired the creation of the passengers aboard the Zinderneuf, such as Veronica Lake (Veronica Marlowe), Johnny Weissmuller (Buck Battle), and Hedda Hopper (Margaret Vandergilt).

Reception
The Atari 8-bit version of Murder on the Zinderneuf was reviewed by Video magazine in its "Arcade Alley" column. Reviewers called it, "as entertaining as it is innovative", and described it as "one of the most distinctive titles to be published [in 1983]". Specific praise was given the game's replay option which offers a different fact pattern for each playthrough.

Allen Doum of Computer Gaming World stated that "Murder on the Zinderneuf is a mystery game for those people who don't have time for a twelve-hour deadline". The magazine's David and Diana Stone were impressed with Murder on the Zinderneuf'''s 1930s characters, each with colorful, easily distinguished graphics. They liked the attention to particular details, such as the engine noise increasing as the player moves towards the back of the zeppelin. In addition to the game being fair and winnable, the reviewers reported playing it 20 times and only seeing two repeat "confessions".Softline stated that Free Fall "came up with a game that's every bit as delightful as Archon". Ahoy! called Murder on the Zinderneuf "the most intriguing mystery game I have ever played ... for a mystery fan it is a dream come true". PC Magazine gave the game 15 points out of 18, noting the importance of acting in accordance with the chosen detective character's personality when questioning suspects.

Reviews
 Casus Belli'' #24 (Feb 1985)

References

External links
Murder on the Zinderneuf at Atari Mania

A partial transcription of the booklet that came with the game

1983 video games
Airships in fiction
Apple II games
Atari 8-bit family games
Commodore 64 games
Detective video games
Electronic Arts games
Ariolasoft games
Puzzle video games
Video games about police officers
Video games featuring female protagonists
Video games set in 1936
Video games developed in the United States